Steudel is a surname, and refers to the following:

 Ernst Gottlieb von Steudel (1783–1856), German physician and an authority on grasses
 Helga Steudel (born 1939), German former motorcyclist and car racer
 Johann Christian Friedrich Steudel (1779–1837), German Lutheran theologian
  (1825–1891), Austrian politician
 Ralf Steudel (born 1937), German chemist and author
 , early 20th century German car maker
 Wilhelm Steudel (1829–1903), German entomologist

Steudel